Sampath Parthasarathy is a former Associate Dean of Research and current Professor and Florida Hospital Chair in Cardiovascular Science in the College of Medicine at the University of Central Florida. He is the editor-in-chief of Healthcare and co-editor-in-chief of the Journal of Medicinal Food.

References

External links
Faculty page
Bio at Drug Discovery India 2017 conference website

Living people
University of Central Florida faculty
American food scientists
Medical journal editors
Year of birth missing (living people)